Carphochaete wislizeni is a species of Mexican  flowering plants in the family Asteraceae. They are native to Chihuahua, Sonora, and Durango in northern Mexico.

References

External links
photo of herbarium specimen at Missouri Botanical Garden, collected in Chihuahua, type specimen of Carphochaete wislizeni 

Eupatorieae
Flora of Mexico
Plants described in 1849